Young at Art is a studio album by jazz alto saxophonist Jesse Davis.

Music and recording
On "East of the Sun", "Davis opens with a moving solo that never loses the lyric", then guitarist Peter Bernstein solos. "Brother Roj" is a medium-tempo waltz that is "dedicated to Davis' older brother, Roger, who brought Jesse his first alto sax".

Critical reception

The AllMusic reviewer wrote that the album is "a fine example of high-quality bebop played by some promising young players", comparing Davis with Cannonball Adderley. The Skanner's reviewer, commenting on Davis, wrote that "I feel he hasn't allowed himself to fully reach his current limits. I hope his next release will hear him loosen the ties to the past and step forward in time".

Track listing
All tracks composed by Jesse Davis; except where indicated
"East of the Sun" (Brooks Bowman) – 5:34
"Brother Roj" – 7:26
"I Love Paris" (Cole Porter) – 9:33
"Ask Me Now" (Thelonious Monk) – 5:30
"Georgiana" – 5:50
"Waltz for Andre" – 7:02
"Little Flowers" – 5:54
"One for Cannon" – 6:01
"Tipsy" – 7:27
"Fine and Dandy" (Kay Swift, Paul James) – 4:32

Personnel
 Jesse Davis – alto saxophone
 Brad Mehldau – piano
 Peter Bernstein – guitar
 Dwayne Burno – bass
 Leon Parker – drums
 Ted Klum – alto saxophone (track 8)

References

1993 albums
albums produced by Carl Jefferson
Concord Records albums
Jazz albums by American artists